The 2015 Canadian Senior Curling Championships was held from March 21 to 28 at the Thistle Curling Club in Edmonton, Alberta. The winners represented Canada at the 2016 World Senior Curling Championships.

Men

Teams
The teams are listed as follows:

Round-robin standings
Final round-robin standings

Championship Pool Standings
Final round-robin standings

Playoffs

Semifinals
Saturday, March 28, 9:30

Bronze-medal game
Saturday, March 28, 2:30 pm

Final
Saturday, March 28, 2:30 pm

Women

Teams
The teams are listed as follows:

Round-robin standings
Final round-robin standings

Championship Pool Standings
Final round-robin standings

Playoffs

Semifinals
Saturday, March 28, 9:30

Bronze-medal game
Saturday, March 28, 2:30 pm

Final
Saturday, March 28, 2:30 pm

References

External links

 

2015 in Canadian curling
Canadian Senior Curling Championships
Curling in Alberta
2015 in Alberta
Sport in Edmonton